The  Desha Putra Sammanaya (දේශ පුත්‍ර සමිමානය, dēśa putra sammānaya, "Son of the Country Award") is awarded to police officers in Sri Lanka  for sustaining serious injuries while facing terrorist attacks and on the line of duty. The medal is based on the Desha Putra Sammanaya issued by the Sri Lankan armed forces, however with a different ribbon.

See also

 Awards and decorations of the Sri Lanka Police
 Desha Putra Sammanaya

References

External links

Sri Lanka Police

Civil awards and decorations of Sri Lanka
Law enforcement awards and honors
Awards established in 1982
1982 establishments in Sri Lanka
Wound decorations